Simon Richard Green (born 25 August 1955) is a British science fiction and fantasy author.

Green was born in Bradford on Avon, Wiltshire.  He holds a degree in modern English and American literature from the University of Leicester. He began his writing career in 1973, sold his first story "Manslayer" in 1976, and published his first full-length work, Awake, Awake, Ye Northern Winds in 1979.  Green began his rise to success in 1988 when he sold seven novels and in 1989 when he received a commission to write the bestselling novelization of the Kevin Costner film Robin Hood: Prince of Thieves, which has sold more than 370,000 copies.  Since 1990, Green has written dozens more novels and short stories, placing him among the more prolific science fiction and fantasy authors to date.  He currently resides in Bradford on Avon, Wiltshire, United Kingdom where he continues to write.

Major works

Deathstalker

 Deathstalker (1995)
 Deathstalker Rebellion (1996)
 Deathstalker War (1997)
 Deathstalker Honour (1998)
 Deathstalker Destiny (1999)
 Deathstalker Legacy (2003)
 Deathstalker Return (2004)
 Deathstalker Coda (2005)

Hawk and Fisher 
 Hawk & Fisher (1990)
 Hawk & Fisher: Winner Takes All (1991)
 Hawk & Fisher: The God Killer (1991)
 Hawk & Fisher: Wolf in the Fold (1991)
 Hawk & Fisher: Guard Against Dishonor (1991)
 Hawk & Fisher: The Bones of Haven (1992)

The Forest Kingdom 
 Blue Moon Rising (1991)
 Blood and Honor (1992)
 Down Among the Dead Men (1993)
 Beyond the Blue Moon (2000)
 Once in a Blue Moon (2014)

The Nightside 
 Something from the Nightside (2003)
 Agents of Light and Darkness (2003)
 Nightingale's Lament (2004)
 Hex and the City (2005)	
 Paths Not Taken (2005)	
 Sharper Than a Serpent's Tooth (2006)	
 Hell to Pay (2006)	
 The Unnatural Inquirer (2008)	
 Just Another Judgement Day (2009)	
 The Good, the Bad and The Uncanny (2010)	
 A Hard Day's Knight (2011)	
 The Bride Wore Black Leather (2012)

Secret Histories 
 The Man with the Golden Torc (2007)
 Daemons Are Forever (2008)
 The Spy Who Haunted Me (2009)
 From Hell with Love (2010)
 For Heaven's Eyes Only (2011)
 Live and Let Drood (2012)
 Casino Infernale (2013)
 Property of a Lady Faire (2014)
 From a Drood to a Kill (2015)
 Dr DOA (2016)
 Moonbreaker (2017)
 Night Fall (2018)

Ghost Finders 
 Ghost of a Chance (2010)
 Ghost of a Smile (2011)
 Ghost of a Dream (2012)
 Spirits from Beyond (2013)
 Voices from Beyond (2014)
 Forces from Beyond (2015)

Ishmael Jones 
 The Dark Side of the Road (2015)
 Dead Man Walking (2016)
 Very Important Corpses (2016)
 Death Shall Come (2017)
 Into the Thinnest of Air (2018)
 Murder in the Dark (2018)
 Till Sudden Death Do Us Part (2019)
 Night Train to Murder (2019)
 The House on Widows Hill (2020)
 Buried Memories (2021)
 Haunted by the Past (2022)

Standalone novels 
 Robin Hood: Prince of Thieves (1991)
 Shadows Fall (1994)
 Drinking Midnight Wine (2002)

External links
Simon R. Green Official Site (archive.org)
 

Living people
1955 births
British fantasy writers
Urban fantasy writers
People from Bradford-on-Avon
English male novelists